Peter Adams (born 1944) is a retired diplomat of New Zealand.

In 1977, after researching and writing Fatal Necessity: British Intervention in New Zealand, 1830–1847 while at Oxford University on a Rhodes scholarship, Adams worked in the New Zealand Agency for International Development. He was then employed in the headquarters of the United Nations in New York City, in Washington, D.C., and in Suva (Fiji).

In 1985 he was deputy director of the South Pacific Bureau of Economic Cooperation (SPEC). From 1998 to 2001 he was ambassador in Beijing. From 2001 until his retirement in 2009 he was executive director of the New Zealand Agency for International Development.

He lives in Wellington and writes short fiction and poetry.

References

1944 births
Ambassadors of New Zealand to China
Living people